Ali Raza (born 28 May 1987) is a Pakistani first-class cricketer who plays for Faisalabad cricket team.

References

External links
 

1987 births
Living people
Pakistani cricketers
Faisalabad cricketers
Khan Research Laboratories cricketers
Sui Northern Gas Pipelines Limited cricketers
Cricketers from Faisalabad